The Dutch States Party was a political faction of the United Provinces of the Netherlands. This republican faction is usually (negatively) defined as the opponents of the Orangist, or  faction, who supported the monarchical aspirations of the stadtholders, who were usually (in this context) members of the House of Orange-Nassau. The two factions existed during the entire history of the Republic since the Twelve Years' Truce, be it that the role of "usual opposition party" of the States party was taken over by the Patriots after the Orangist revolution of 1747. The States party was in the ascendancy during the First Stadtholderless Period and the Second Stadtholderless Period.

Ideological characteristics

The two factions were not political parties in the modern sense of the word. They were mostly kept together by animosity between families belonging to the Regenten class on the local level, for reasons that differed between localities. These local factions might take sides to either faction simply based on the fact that their opponents were loyal to the other faction. There was little explicit ideological coherence, and whatever ideology existed on either side differed with changing circumstances over the course of the history of the Republic. Still, since the days of the conflict between Maurice, Prince of Orange and Land's Advocate of Holland Johan van Oldenbarnevelt the States Party stood for provincial sovereignty, vested in the provincial States (like the States of Holland), whereas the Orangist party emphasized the "supra-provincial" sovereignty, residing in the States-General of the Netherlands. The supremacy of the provincial States was first defended by François Vranck in his debate with Thomas Wilkes in 1587 during the rule of the Earl of Leicester as governor-general under the English protectorate, and later taken up by Hugo Grotius in his De antiquitate reipublicae Batavicae (On the Antiquity of the Batavian Republic). The theme was taken up again during the conflict between stadtholder William II and the States of Holland in 1650, in which first the Prince prevailed, and after his death the States, ushering in the "True Freedom" of the First Stadtholderless Period.

The doctrine of the "True Freedom" was expounded by political philosophers like the Grand Pensionary Johan de Witt in his "Deduction" and Pieter de la Court in his the Interest van Holland (Interest of Holland) and  De stadthouderlijcke regeeringe in Hollandt ende West-Vrieslandt (History of the stadholders of Holland and West-Friesland). In these works the doctrine was extended into a distinctly anti-monarchical and pro-republican direction as a justification for the de facto abolition of the office of stadtholder in most provinces as "superfluous" and "positively harmful to the general welfare.."

Representatives
Some of the most important representatives of the States Party in the history of the Republic were:

Loevesteiners
1650
Johan van Oldenbarnevelt
Hugo Grotius
Gilles van Ledenberg
Jacob de Witt

First Stadtholderless Period
1650-1672
Johan de Witt
Cornelis de Witt
Jacob Dircksz de Graeff
Cornelis de Graeff
Andries de Graeff
Andries Bicker
Cornelis Bicker
Johan Huydecoper van Maarsseveen

Second Stadtholderless Period
1702-1747
Anthonie Heinsius
Isaac van Hoornbeek
Simon van Slingelandt
Anthonie van der Heim
Willem Buys
Jacob Gilles

Notes

References

Political history of the Dutch Republic
Defunct political parties in the Netherlands
Republicanism in the Netherlands
Historiography of the Netherlands